Battle Hymn of China, by Agnes Smedley. Also published as China Correspondent. This book is a first-hand account of the Sino-Japanese War, from the viewpoint of a left-wing US woman who tried sharing the lives of ordinary Chinese.

Synopsis
It was written at a time when the Kuomintang and the Chinese Communist Party were in a United Front against the Japanese invasion, and before the Japanese attack on the United States at Pearl Harbor.

Agnes Smedley had spent many years in China, and spent much of it with the various armies, both regular and guerrilla. Like Edgar Snow, she met the future leaders of Communist China when they were living in rural isolation. She also witnessed the Xian Incident and gives her own account of it in this book, along with her view of He Long, Chu Teh (Zhu De) and Mao. She takes her own very distinct view of Mao:

What I now remember of Mao Tze-tung was the following months of precious friendship; they both confirmed and contradicted his inscrutability. The sinister quality I had first felt so strongly in him proved to be spiritual isolation. As Chu Teh was loved, Mao Tze-tung was respected. The few who came to know him best had affection for him, but his spirit dwelt within itself, isolating him...

In him was none of the humility of Chu. Despite that feminine quality in him, he was as stubborn as a mule and a steel rod of pride and determination ran through his nature. I had the impression that he would wait and watch for years, but eventually have his way. (Book IV, Chapter 3, p. 122 of the Victor Gollancz edition.)

She also spent a lot time with the rank-and-file and with non-Communist Chinese, living at the same level as ordinary Chinese and using basic First Aid skills to help in hospitals where both supplies and trained staff were short.

Though the book describes a war, it is mostly about how various individuals react to the war, mostly Chinese but also foreigners. She gives a poignant account of how she wanted to adopt a Chinese boy who had served as her orderly, and to secure a good education for him. But the boy felt it was his duty to stay with the army.

She takes an individual and non-ideological view, noting merit where she sees it, including among captured Japanese who had turned against the war. She also notes and praises a community of nuns that was living at the same level as poor Chinese. She takes a polite view of Chiang Kai-shek and praises the work of Madame Chiang Kai-shek (Soong Mei-ling).

Although the book was published in 1943, it ends with the events of 1941. A Japanese attack on the European powers and the United States is correctly foreseen. She frequently notes how the Japanese were using war materials supplied by the USA.

The book was highly influential at the time.  It is not currently in print, but was re-issued in 1984 under the title China Correspondent. It is frequently cited as a source in biographies of Mao.

References

External links
 Scholarly review from 1944
 Jacket design by Jean Carlu at Flickr
 Mentioned in a scholarly review from 1988
 A Chinese view of Smedley and her books

1944 non-fiction books
20th-century history books
Biographies (books)
Books about communism
Second Sino-Japanese War
History books about World War II
Alfred A. Knopf books
History books about China
History books about Japan
History books about the Second Sino-Japanese War